Pierre Dufault (born November 5, 1934) is a Canadian former journalist and sports commentator. He began as a political correspondent and reporter for the Canadian Football League (CFL) in radio at CKCH then on television at CBOFT-DT. He joined the sports department of Radio-Canada in 1972 as a play-by-play announcer for CFL games and regularly covered the Olympic Games and Commonwealth Games. He was president of Football Reporters of Canada in 1984, became the late night sports report host for Radio-Canada in 1993, and was inducted into the reporters section of the Canadian Football Hall of Fame in 2001.

Early life
Dufault was born on November 5, 1934, in the Lower Town neighbourhood of Ottawa. He became interested in Canadian football in 1948 at the 36th Grey Cup. He started in journalism in 1952, writing for Ottawa's French language daily newspaper, Le Droit. Dufault later said he was fired a few months into the job for not being competent enough. He subsequently studied at the University of Ottawa.

Career
Dufault worked in radio at CKCH in Hull, Quebec, from 1955 to 1964, where he started as a reporter then eventually became the director. During his tenure at CKCH, he began a career covering the Canadian Football League (CFL), and was a political correspondent for 22 municipal, provincial and federal elections. He then worked for Radio-Canada at CBOFT-DT in Ottawa from 1964 to 1972. CBOFT-DT broadcast French language coverage of the 1968 Canadian federal election on short notice when a conflict arose the day before the election between Radio-Canada in Montreal and the local journalists' union. Dufault was phoned at home 50 minutes before the broadcast was to begin and rushed to the studios as an emergency news anchor. He later said that station management had congratulated him the next day on a job well done, but had been unaware of his prior experience as a political correspondent.

Dufault joined the sports department for Radio-Canada in 1972. He was a radio broadcaster for the Olympic Games from 1972 until 1980, then worked television broadcasts for the Olympic Games until 1998. He also covered swimming events for the Commonwealth Games from 1974 to 1994, and was a regular play-by-play announcer for CFL games on Radio-Canada from 1973 to 1988.

Dufault began teaching a radio course in Canadian French at The Dave Boxer School of Broadcasting in 1979, then became a part owner of the school in 1981. He hosted the CFL's Most Outstanding Player Award presentations in the 1980s and was president of Football Reporters of Canada in 1984. He became the late night sports report host for Radio-Canada in 1993. Dufault retired from full-time sports broadcasting in 1996, and was inducted into the reporters section of the Canadian Football Hall of Fame in 2001.

In a 2018 interview with Le Droit, Dufault recalled that he pieced together an eight-minute radio report of what happened in the Munich massacre at the 1972 Summer Olympics, and claimed to have been the first reporter at the scene. He also stated that his coverage of the 1968 Canadian federal election and the Munich massacre were days he would never forget. He referred to himself as a "voice guy", and that he worked for Radio-Canada at a time when its sports commentators, hosts and journalists were hired for their skills, knowledge and experience, rather than a reputation as an athlete or a coach.

Family
Dufault is a nephew of artist and writer Ernest Dufault, better known by the alias Will James. He is also related to singer Luce Dufault.

Notes

References

External links
 Chronology of Pierre Dufault via CJFO-FM (interview in French)
 Pierre Dufault remembers 1972 via TVA Sports (interview in French)

1934 births
Living people
20th-century Canadian journalists
Canadian colour commentators
Canadian Football Hall of Fame inductees
Canadian Football League announcers
Canadian football people from Ottawa
Canadian male journalists
Canadian political commentators
Canadian radio hosts
Canadian radio sportscasters
Canadian television journalists
Canadian television sportscasters
Franco-Ontarian people
Ice hockey people from Ottawa
Journalists from Ontario
Olympic Games broadcasters
University of Ottawa alumni